Blåsippor, also known after the opening words Blåsippan ute i backarna står, is a children's springtime song with lyrics written by Anna Maria Roos. It was originally published as a poem in Lilla Elnas sagor in 1894. It was set to music by Alice Tegnér and published as a song in 1895 in volume 3 of "Sjung med oss, mamma!"

Publications
Sjung med oss, mamma!, volume 3, 1895
Nu ska vi sjunga, 1943, under the lines "Visor om djur och blommor" ("Songs about animals and flowers")

Recordings 
Sylvan Beré and Knut Edgardt did an early recording inside the Stockholm Concert Hall on 19 June 1947, as part of a medley of children's songs released on a record in December that year. The song has also been recorded by Ingela "Pling" Forsman on a 1975 album with songs from the songbook "Nu ska vi sjunga".

References 

1894 poems
1895 songs
Swedish children's songs
Songs about flowers